Thestius is a genus of hairstreak butterflies in the family Lycaenidae. The species of this genus are found in the Neotropical realm.

Species
Thestius pholeus (Cramer, [1777])
Thestius selina (Hewitson, 1869)
Thestius meridionalis (Draudt, 1870)
Thestius epopea (Hewitson, 1870)
Thestius azaria (Hewitson, 1867)
Thestius lycabas (Cramer, [1777])

References

External links 
"Thestius Hübner, [1819]" at Markku Savela's Lepidoptera and Some Other Life Forms

Eumaeini
Lycaenidae of South America
Lycaenidae genera
Taxa named by Jacob Hübner